Petro Timofiyovich Tronko (12 July 1915 - 12 September 2011) was a Ukrainian academician of the National Academy of Sciences of Ukraine and veteran of World War II.

He was the head of the editorial collegium for the 26-volume encyclopedia on "The History of Cities and Villages of the Ukrainian SSR.

Early life and career 
Born during World War I in 1915 to a peasant family in Sloboda Ukraine, Tronko started to work in 1932 in mines of Dzerzhynsk. Eventually, after finishing some teaching classes, he worked as a teacher of social sciences and the Ukrainian language in the village school of Bohodukhiv Raion and as director of Lebedyn children's home. Since 1937 he worked in Komsomol and in 1939 joined the Communist Party of Soviet Union.

In 1939 Tronko was a member of the Western Ukrainian People's Assembly that voted in for the Western Ukraine to join the Ukrainian SSR.
During World War II he was a member of the South-western, Stalingrad, Southern, 4th Ukrainian fronts, participated in the defense of Kyiv and Stalingrad and later in the liberation of Rostov, Donbas, Left-bank Ukraine, and Kyiv. One of the first, Tronko entered the liberated Kyiv on 6 November 1943 as a major and was appointed the first secretary of the city and regional Komsomol organization. In 1947 he was dismissed from the position due to accusations of Lazar Kaganovich in "nationalistic perversions".

Post-war 
His dismissal from Komsomol work, Tronko used for education and in 1948 he graduated from the Historical faculty of Kyiv University. The same year Tronko enrolled into aspirantura of the Academy of Social Sciences (today – Russian Academy of State Service) of the Central Committee of the Communist Party of the Soviet Union defending his dissertation in three years.

In 1951-60 Tronko worked for the Kyiv regional committee of the Communist Party of Ukraine and in 1960-61 he headed the department of propaganda and ideological agitation for the party. During the next 17 years (1961–78) Tronko worked as a Deputy Chairman of the Council of Ministers of the Ukrainian SSR taking care of matters on culture, education, healthcare, press, book publishing, cinema, radio and television broadcasting, social sciences and archives. He was a member of Verkhovna Rada for nine convocations.

In 1968 Tronko defended his doctorate dissertation "Ukrainian people in the fight against Hitlerites occupiers during the Great Patriotic War (1941-45)".

In 1969 Tronko initiated the creation of Pyrohiv scansen that was opened in 1976.

In independent Ukraine
He was a deputy of the Verkhovna Rada of Ukraine. He was an advisor to the President Leonid Kuchma on the preservation of historical heritage.

Shortly before his death, he suffered a stroke. He was buried in Kyiv on the central alley of Baikove Cemetery.

A memorial plaque was installed in his honor, in his native village. In 2015, in Kyiv, the nameless passage between Zabolotny Street and the Pyrohiv Museum was named after academician Tronko.

References

External links
 Makhun, S. Petro TRONKO: “Before the war Kyiv had 950,000 inhabitants and after liberation about 100,000”. Newspaper Day. 12 November 2002.
 Vechersky, V. Historical and urban-developing studies of Kyiv. Kyiv: Feniks, 2012
95th anniversary of the famous Ukrainian historian scholar Petro Tronko. Orthodoxy Cognate
Profile at the Heroes of Ukraine website

1915 births
2011 deaths
People from Kharkiv Oblast
People from Kharkov Governorate
Taras Shevchenko National University of Kyiv, Historical faculty alumni
Kyiv Higher Party School alumni
Russian Academy of State Service alumni
Soviet military personnel of World War II
20th-century Ukrainian historians
Second convocation members of the Verkhovna Rada of the Ukrainian Soviet Socialist Republic
Fifth convocation members of the Verkhovna Rada of the Ukrainian Soviet Socialist Republic
Sixth convocation members of the Verkhovna Rada of the Ukrainian Soviet Socialist Republic
Seventh convocation members of the Verkhovna Rada of the Ukrainian Soviet Socialist Republic
Eighth convocation members of the Verkhovna Rada of the Ukrainian Soviet Socialist Republic
Ninth convocation members of the Verkhovna Rada of the Ukrainian Soviet Socialist Republic
Tenth convocation members of the Verkhovna Rada of the Ukrainian Soviet Socialist Republic
Eleventh convocation members of the Verkhovna Rada of the Ukrainian Soviet Socialist Republic
Vice Prime Ministers of Ukraine on humanitarian policy
Communist Party of Ukraine (Soviet Union) politicians
Members of the National Academy of Sciences of Ukraine
Recipients of the title of Hero of Ukraine
Recipients of the USSR State Prize
Recipients of the Order of Friendship of Peoples
Recipients of the Order of Lenin
Recipients of the Order of Bohdan Khmelnytsky, 3rd class
Recipients of the Order of Bohdan Khmelnytsky, 2nd class
Recipients of the Order of Merit (Ukraine), 3rd class
Recipients of the Order of Prince Yaroslav the Wise, 5th class
Recipients of the Honorary Diploma of the Cabinet of Ministers of Ukraine